"Never In A Million Years" is the lead single release from After The Morning, the third album by Cara Dillon. The single was released as a promo for radio stations in the UK and Ireland. The single was also released exclusively by iTunes as a digital download a week prior to the release of After the Morning, where it climbed to #39 in the iTunes Top 100.

Track listing
"Never in a Million Years" (Album version)

Personnel
Cara Dillon - vocals
Sam Lakeman – piano, guitar, accordion, percussion, producer
Simon Lea – drums
Ben Nicholls – upright bass
Neil MacColl – guitar, mandolin
Roy Dodds - percussion

Notes and references

2006 singles